Woodcot Hospital was a health facility in Woodcot Brae, Stonehaven, Scotland. It is a Category B listed building.

History
The hospital had its origins in the Kincardineshire Combination Poorhouse which was design by William Henderson and completed in August 1867. It was converted for clinical use and joined the National Health Service as Woodcot Hospital in 1948. It closed in 1998 and the main building was converted into a luxury apartment complex known as Woodcot Court in 2000.

References

Hospitals established in 1867
1867 establishments in Scotland
Hospital buildings completed in 1867
NHS Grampian
Defunct hospitals in Scotland
Hospitals in Aberdeenshire
Stonehaven